The Rae Baronetcy, of Eskgrove in the County of Midlothian, was a title in the Baronetage of the United Kingdom. It was created on 27 June 1804 for the Scottish judge David Rae, Lord Eskgrove. The third Baronet was Lord Advocate between 1819 and 1830 and 1834 and 1835. The title became extinct on his death in 1842.

Rae baronets, of Esk Grove (1804)
Sir David Rae, 1st Baronet (–1804)
Sir David Rae, 2nd Baronet (died 1815)
Sir William Rae, 3rd Baronet (1769–1842)

References

Extinct baronetcies in the Baronetage of the United Kingdom